Simon Phillips Norton (28 February 1952 – 14 February 2019) was a mathematician in Cambridge, England, who worked on finite simple groups.

Education
Simon Norton was born into a Sephardi family of Iraqi descent, the youngest of three brothers.

From 1964 he was a King's Scholar at Eton College, where he earned a reputation as an eccentric mathematical genius. He obtained an external first-class degree in Pure Mathematics at the University of London while still at the school, commuting to Royal Holloway College.

He also represented the United Kingdom three years running at the International Mathematical Olympiad, and winning a gold medal each time.

He then went up to Trinity College, Cambridge, and achieved a first in the final examinations.

Career and Life
He stayed at Cambridge, working on finite groups. Norton was one of the authors of the ATLAS of Finite Groups. He constructed the Harada–Norton group and in 1979 together with John Conway proved there is a connection between the Monster group and the j-function in number theory. They dubbed this "monstrous moonshine", and made some conjectures later proved by Richard Borcherds. Norton also made several early discoveries in Conway's Game of Life, and invented the game Snort.

In 1985, Cambridge University did not renew his contract.

Norton is the subject of the biography The Genius in My Basement, written by his Cambridge tenant, Alexander Masters, which describes his eccentric lifestyle and his life-long obsession with buses. He was also an occasional contributor to Word Ways: The Journal of Recreational Linguistics.

Norton was very interested in transport issues and was a member of Subterranea Britannica. He coordinated the local group of the Campaign for Better Transport (United Kingdom), and had done so since the organisation was known as Transport 2000, writing most of the newsletter for the local Cambridge group and tirelessly campaigning for efficient, inclusive and environmentally friendly public transport in the region and across the United Kingdom.

He collapsed and died in north London, aged 66, of a heart condition on 14 February 2019.

Selected publications

 1995: (with C. J. Cummins) 
 1996: 
 1996: 
 1998: 
 2001: 
 2002: (with Robert A. Wilson)

References

External links 
 
 
 Simon Norton at the Cambridge mathematics department
 
 Feature profile on National Public Radio's Weekend Edition Sunday, 02/26/12 The Genius In My Basement
 Cambridgeshire Campaign for Better Transport (Archive) coordinated by Simon Norton, who authored the bulk of the newsletters and reports.

1952 births
2019 deaths
British people of Iraqi-Jewish descent
People educated at Eton College
Alumni of Trinity College, Cambridge
20th-century English  mathematicians
21st-century English mathematicians
Group theorists
Cellular automatists
International Mathematical Olympiad participants
Cambridge mathematicians